Alota is a genus of grasshoppers in the subfamily Gomphocerinae with species found in Bolivia and Colombia.

Species 
The following species are recognised in the genus Alota:
 Alota boliviana Bruner, 1913
 Alota carbonelli Cadena-Castañeda & Cardona, 2015

References 

Acrididae